The Los Ríos Region  (Spanish: Región de Los Ríos,  Region of the Rivers) is one of Chile's 16 regions, the country's first-order administrative divisions. Its capital is Valdivia. It began to operate as a region on October 2, 2007, having been created by subdividing the Los Lagos Region in southern Chile. It consists of two provinces: Valdivia and the newly created Ranco Province, which was formerly part of Valdivia Province.

Economy

The region's economy is based on forestry, cattle farming, tourism, manufacturing, and services. Key industries include the Valdivia Pulp Mill, Valdivia's shipyards, and the dairy facilities located in La Unión.

The population of the region was 380,181 according to the 2017 census. Approximately half of the population lives in the commune of Valdivia.

Government and administration
The capital of Los Rios Region is Valdivia.

The region's 12 communes are distributed between 2 provinces. These are:
Valdivia Province: Including Valdivia, Mariquina, Lanco, Panguipulli, Máfil, Los Lagos, Paillaco, and Corral municipalities
Ranco Province: Including La Unión, Río Bueno, Lago Ranco and Futrono municipalities.

Valdivia is part of Northern Patagonia as its wild virgin forest embrace the Patagonian Cordillera following the river Calle Calle down to the Pacific Ocean. It is known in Patagonia the term " Bosque Valdiviano" referring to the primitive virgin forest found in the cordillera valleys of Valdivia which include dense masses of native trees. These Forest are present in some parts of Northern Patagonia both in Chile and Argentina.

Commune government

Demography
In the last census, of 2017, Los Ríos Region (then Valdivia Province) registered a population of 380,181 inhabitants. By this number the region is ranked 10th among Chile's 16 regions and has a share of 2.35% of the national total. The regions rural population represents 32% of the total, which is explained by the fact that almost half of the population lives in the city of Valdivia and that the cities of Río Bueno and La Unión have together 50,000 inhabitants. This percentage of rural population is well above the national average which is of 13.4%. The population of Los Ríos has a relatively high percentage of people who self-identify as indigenous of 11.3% it means 40,515 persons. To compare, the national average is of 4.58%. It has a large German presence alike the nearby Los Lagos Region. See also German colonization of Valdivia, Osorno and Llanquihue

Settlements

History

Republic of Chile
In the beginning of the Chilean Republic, Valdivia was one of the original eight provinces established. The reason for the incorporation was not so much the value of Valdivia, per se, but to minimize the threat to Chilean independence posed by Spaniards in the territory. As German Chilean immigrants arrived in the city during the mid 19th century, the local economy started to develop industries. By 1900, Valdivia was the third most industrialized city in Chile, however, a period of decline started with the world wars. After the Great Chilean earthquake in 1960, Valdivia fell deeper into decline. Much of the city was destroyed and many people left the city.

In 1974 the military junta reorganized the political divisions of Chile deciding that Valdivia was no longer adequate to be a "first class administrative territory" capital. Hence, it was reclassified into a province within Los Lagos Region and Puerto Montt was designated capital. Valdivians greatly resented this decision because they felt they were better suited to be the capital than Puerto Montt, holding forth the following arguments:

Valdivia was founded in 1552,
Valdivia had resisted pirate attacks and hostile natives,
Valdivia had survived several earthquakes,
Puerto Montt, founded in 1853, three hundred and one years later, was a considerably newer city.

Creation of the new region
On October 19, 2005 Chilean President Ricardo Lagos signed a bill allowing for the creation of Los Ríos Region ("The Rivers Region"). The bill was approved by Congress on December 19, 2006; it was signed into law on March 16, 2007 and published on April 5, 2007. According to the Roman numeral designation, currently used in Chile, this region is number XIV (fourteenth). However, steps are being taken to no longer refer to the regions by numbers.

Osorno
When the new region was considered by Congress, Osorno made several proposals:
 To make Osorno the new capital
 To make La Unión the capital
 To expand Osorno Province adding to it the comuna of Río Bueno.
It was proposed that Osorno Province join as the third province of the new region, instead of remaining the fourth province of Los Lagos Region, however, in a referendum held in 2006 the residents of that province rejected the idea.

Geography

Los Ríos Region lies in the southern temperate zone and in a tectonically active milieu. Four distinct landscape types, or morphological units, can be distinguished in the region. These are from west to east; the Coastal Range, the Intermediate Depression, the Precordillera and the Andes. These units are oriented parallel to the coast and the subduction zone there. An exception to this are the eastern hills in Mariquina and Máfil that despite belonging to the Coast Range system adrift eastwards and comes very close to the Precordillera cutting the Intermediate Depression in two. The Coastal Cordillera does not exceed the 1000 m in height being Cerro Oncol (715 m) the highest point in the section north of Valdivia River. The Coast Range is cut by Valdivia and Bueno Rivers, deeply incised rivers that drains the inland. Most of the Coast is covered by native Valdivian temperate rain forest, although it has in some parts been substituted by plantations of exotic species, specially Douglas firs and eucalyptus.

Two great agricultural flatlands exist in the region, the Mariquina valley and Los Llanos of La Unión and Río Bueno. The first one is a tectonic depression in the Coast Range connected to Valdivia by Cruces River and the second is the continuation of the Intermediate Depression that re-opens south of Máfil. The flatlands and mayor river valleys form large, open, cultural landscapes used as grassing meadows or for growing crops.

The Precordillera is a narrow band characterized by hosting a large number of deep glacial piedmont lakes that are dammed by moraines. These lakes intersect forested granitic mountain massifs of up to 1500 m. The Precordilleran hills and mountains have step slopes to the north and south as the main direction of the Quaternary glaciers where from east to west. Many lake shores are cleared lands where agriculture, settlements and resort areas develop.

Andes
The proper Andes extends from the eastern half of the Precordillean lakes to the border with Neuquén Province in Argentina. The Andes in this part of Chile, the Zona Sur, has almost escaped the Andean orogenesis. Here the Andes consist of old granitic plutons such as the Panguipulli Batholith and the North Patagonian Batholith together with volcanics and some minor areas of sediments and metasediments. As result of the minimal Andean mountainbuilding the mountains shows little rejuvenation and are mostly shaped by erosive agents, specially glaciers. An exception to this are the several volcanoes that rises east of the piedmont lakes, this volcanoes are among the most active in Chile and as result their form are influenced by the eruptions; either in constructive manner such as Villarrica Volcano or more destructive like Quetrupillán. The fact that these volcanoes have the ability to build up cones and rise again after erosion and explosive eruptions makes many of them the highest mountains in the region and Zona Sur. The volcanoes of Los Ríos Regions belong to the Southern Volcanic Zone of Andes, whose current activity front is located about 200 km west from the main Andean cordillera, this makes volcanoes stand out as isolated snow-covered cones of more than 2000 m, above the lower mountains that rarely pass the 1500 m. The main cordillera makes up the continental divide and are therefore according to the 1881 Argentina-Chile treaty the border between the two nations. Faults and glacier action have however made a gap at the site of Huahum Pass where waters from the eastern Argentine slopes drains westward to the Pacific Mountains at the cordillera may reach at most some 2000 m in height. Andean valleys of Los Ríos Region are deep and broad and either used for raising cattle or for wood lodging, as well as tourism and protection of biodiversity. These glacial valleys are placed above old Miocene rivers and faults. The chief fault is the Liquiñe-Ofqui Fault that crosses the whole region from north to south allowing numerous valleys to develop above it. The Liquiñe-Ofqui Fault is tectonically active causing minor tremors and is also believed responsible by geologists for the alignment of the volcanoes of the southern section of the Southern Volcanic Zone. Along Liquiñe-Ofqui Fault there are several hotsprings such as Liquiñe, Chihuío, Termas Geométricas, Termas Vergara and Termas de Coñaripe.

Hydrography
The region owes its name to the river network that converge in Valdivia River at the city of Valdivia. These rivers drain most of northern Los Ríos Region as well as parts of Araucanía Region and Neuquén Province in Argentina. A second large river, Bueno River is responsible for the draining of the southern parts of the region including Ranco Lake, Chile's 4th largest lake. Bueno River and its tributary Pilmaiquén River also drain large areas of Osorno Province and form the southern boundary of the region. These two big river systems receive a continuous inflow of water due to being fed by lakes and lake chains in the Andes. Valdivia River is provided by the Seven Lakes chain plus Lácar Lake and Bueno River from Ranco, Maihue and Puyehue Lake. The large lakes in the interior are fed by rainwater and snow melt from the higher mountains. Glaciers and semipermanent snow patches have relatively low share flow volume of the main rivers.

Culture 
The Valdivia International Film Festival (FICV) is the most important film event in Chile, one of the most important worldwide and in Latin America. It has been held since 1994, generally during the month of October.

The Valdivia Book Fair is organized annually by the Municipal Cultural Corporation of the city, with the support of the Government of Los Ríos, in the Saval Park. In this context, several authors born in the Los Ríos Region stand out, such as Maha Vial, Iván Espinoza Riesco, José Baroja, Aldo Astete Cuadra, Efraín Miranda Cárdenas, to name a few.

The International Sculpture Symposium of Valdivia is cataloged as one of the most important events in Chile and one of the most prestigious in Latin America.

The Valdivia International Jazz Festival was born in July 2000. Today it is considered the oldest festival in Chile and one of the most important in this musical genre in the Southern Cone.

See also
List of Chile-related topics
Flag of Los Ríos Region
WikiLosRios, a wiki-based web encyclopedia about Los Ríos

Footnotes

References

External links
Ley Nº 20.174 (Law creating the region) 

 
States and territories established in 2007
Regions of Chile
2007 in Chilean law
2007 establishments in Chile